Robert Ainsley Scott (27 October 1894 – 23 October 1990) was an Australian rules footballer who played with Fitzroy in the Victorian Football League (VFL).

Notes

External links 

1894 births
1990 deaths
Australian rules footballers from Victoria (Australia)
Fitzroy Football Club players